Paduka Sri Sultan ‘Ahmad I Ri’ayat Shah Zilu’llah fil’Alam Khalifat ul-Muminin ibni al-Marhum Sultan ‘Abdu’l Jalil (1752–1770) was the 15th Sultan and Yang di-Pertuan Besar of Johor and Pahang and their dependencies who reigned from 1761 to 1770. 

He is the elder son of the 13th Sultan of Johor, Abdul Jalil Muazzam Shah by his second wife, Tengku Puteh binti Daeng Chelak, third daughter of Yamtuan Muda of Riau, Daeng Chelak. He succeeded on the death of his father on January 29, 1761. Crowned in February 1761 at the age of nine, Ahmad Riayat Shah reigned under a Council of Regency. He died of poisoning in 1770, possibly by a Bugis chief, at Bulang, Riau and buried in Batangan.

He was succeeded by his younger brother, Mahmud Shah III.

References

 

1752 births
1770 deaths
Sultans of Johor
18th-century monarchs in Asia
Deaths by poisoning
18th-century murdered monarchs
House of Bendahara of Johor
1770 murders in Asia